The Brasil Tennis Challenger is a professional tennis tournament played on clay courts. It is currently part of the Association of Tennis Professionals (ATP) Challenger Tour. It was first held in Piracicaba, Brazil in 2023.

Past finals

Singles

Doubles

References

ATP Challenger Tour
Clay court tennis tournaments
Tennis tournaments in Brazil
Recurring sporting events established in 2023